Thomas Kretschmer (20 October 1954 – 9 January 2023) was a German engineer and politician. A member of the Christian Democratic Union, he served in the Landtag of Thuringia from 1990 to 2008.

Kretschmer died on 9 January 2023, at the age of 68.

References

1954 births
2023 deaths
20th-century German politicians
21st-century German politicians
Christian Democratic Union of Germany politicians
Members of the Landtag of Thuringia
German engineers
People from Magdeburg